The 1991 Buffalo Bills season was the 32nd season and 22nd in the National Football League (NFL). The Buffalo Bills finished the National Football League's 1991 season with a record of 13 wins and 3 losses, the same record as their previous season, and finished first in the AFC East division. The Bills qualified for their second Super Bowl appearance but lost to the Washington Redskins, 24–37.

Season summary
The Bills No Huddle “K-Gun” offense, after having a breakout 1990 season, once again dominated the league by gaining an NFL leading 6,525 yards and scoring 458 points, a franchise record, and second only to Washington. The leaders of the offense, quarterback Jim Kelly and running back Thurman Thomas, both had the best seasons of their careers. Kelly completed 64.1 percent of his passes for 3,844 yards and a league-leading 33 touchdowns, with only 17 interceptions, to give him a 97.6 passer rating.  Behind his fullback Carwell Gardner, Thomas rushed for 1,407 yards, caught 62 passes for 620 yards, and scored 12 touchdowns to earn him both the NFL Offensive Player of the Year Award and the NFL Most Valuable Player Award. Just like Washington, Buffalo had more than one threat in their backfield. Running back Kenneth Davis emerged as a big threat off the bench, rushing for 624 yards, catching 20 passes for 118 yards, and scoring 5 touchdowns.

The Bills also had several major weapons in their passing game. Wide receiver Andre Reed led the team with 81 receptions for 1,113 yards and 10 touchdowns, and also rushed 12 times for 136 yards. On the other side of the field, veteran wide receiver James Lofton recorded 57 receptions for 1,072 yards and 8 touchdowns to earn his 8th Pro Bowl appearance and finish the year just 55 yards short of the all-time receiving record held by Steve Largent (13,089 yards). Pro Bowl tight end Keith McKeller was also a big contributor with 44 receptions for 434 yards, while receiver Don Beebe had 32 catches, 414 yards, and 6 touchdowns. Once again, the Bills offensive line was led by center Kent Hull along with Pro Bowl guard Jim Ritcher.

Offseason

Draft

Despite few impact players in the later rounds, the Bills’ first two picks had long careers in Buffalo. The first pick, safety Henry Jones, played for the next ten seasons in Buffalo, making the Pro Bowl in his second season. Defensive end Phil Hansen played his entire eleven-year career in Buffalo, joining the team's Wall of Fame in 2011.

Personnel

Staff/coaches

Roster

Preseason

Regular season

Schedule
Pro Football Reference argues that the 1991 Bills gained the second-easiest schedule of any NFL team since 1971, with only the 1999 St. Louis Rams who played only one team with a winning record in the regular season getting an easier set of games. Football Outsiders also argues that the 1991 Bills had the second-easiest schedule between 1989 and 2013 after the 1999 Rams. The Bills played five games against opponents 4–12 or worse, and a quarter of their games were against teams finishing 3–13 or worse, whilst their only opponents with winning records were the NFC Central Lions and Bears, and AFC West Chiefs and Raiders.

Note: Intra-division opponents are in bold text.

Game summaries

Week 1

Source: Pro-Football-Reference.com
    
    
    
    
    
    
    
    
    
    

Despite three touchdowns Dan Marino could not hold off Jim Kelly as the Bills erased a 17–7 Dolphins lead to win 35–31. The two teams combined for 331 rushing yards.

Week 2 

    
    
    
    
    
    
    
    
    
    
    
    
    
    

Jim Kelly erupted to six touchdowns as the Bills crushed the Steelers 52–34.  Kelly threw for 363 yards, overshadowing the 194 rushing yards the Bills produced.

Week 3

The Bills faced stiffer competition in their first road game of the year.  The Jets clawed to a 10–3 lead late in the second; a pass-interference penalty set up a seven-yard Andre Reed touchdown catch.  The Jets led 20–16 lead in the fourth quarter until Thurman Thomas caught a 15-yard score.  The Jets raced downfield in the final seconds but missed a 51-yard field goal attempt, falling 23–20 to the Bills.

Week 4 

Returning for the first time since Super Bowl XXV, Scott Norwood missed two field goal attempts.  The Bucs behind Chris Chandler tied the game in the fourth.  In the final minutes an apparent Bills fumble was nullified, and Keith McKeller caught the winning 29-yard touchdown for the 17–10 final.

Week 5 

The Bills held off the Bears 35–20 after putting up 422 yards of offense to Chicago's 353. Jim Harbaugh was intercepted once.

Week 6 

Harvey Williams and Christian Okoye combined for 225 rushing yards in leading a 33–6 massacre of the Bills; by themselves the two Chiefs backs put up more offense than the entire Bills offensive unit (211 total yards). Steve DeBerg added 150 passing yards and a touchdown as Buffalo's win streak crashed to a halt.

Week 7 

The Bills rebounded by hammering the winless Colts 42–6. The Colts failed to exceed six points for the sixth time in the season so far; they put up just 240 yards of offense vs. 276 rushing yards and four scores by Thurman Thomas, Kenneth Davis, and Carwell Gardner.

Week 8 

The Bills hosted winless Cincinnati in their second Monday Night appearance in three weeks. Jim Kelly overcame three interceptions to toss five touchdowns (tying a Monday Night Football record), winning 35–16.

Week 10 

The Bills struggled to a 22–17 win as Jim Kelly was picked off twice and Leonard Russell rushed for 106 yards and two scores. Jason Staurovsky missed two first-half field goal attempts amid periodic heavy winds at Rich Stadium.  The Patriots got the ball back in the final 50 seconds after Kelly's second pick, but Hugh Millen was himself intercepted at the Bills 20.

Week 11 

The Pack made a game of it as Mike Tomczak tossed for 317 yards and two touchdowns but was intercepted twice. Sterling Sharpe caught a 58-yard touchdown but was also blown up for a 15–yard loss on a rushing attempt.

Week 12 

The Dolphins fumbled three times and Dan Marino was intercepted twice as the Bills rolled to 262 rushing yards and three Jim Kelly touchdowns, winning 41–27.

Week 13 

The Patriots pulled off one of the bigger upsets of the 1991 season as they picked off Jim Kelly four times while Hugh Millen threw a 50-yard score to Irving Fryar and ran in the winning score in a 16–13 win.

Week 14

Jim Kelly and Ken O'Brien were both picked off twice as the Bills clawed to a 24–13 win, overcoming four turnovers and eleven penalties (76 yards).

Week 15 

Amid a burgeoning feud with team owner Al Davis, Marcus Allen put up 95 all-purpose yards on 19 combined touches (16 of them rushes) and a touchdown as the Raiders led 27–14 after three quarters. Scott Norwood had a nightmarish day as he missed a PAT and three FGs but the Bills rallied to tie the game and in overtime Norwood connected on the winning 42-yarder, and a 30–27 Bills win.

Week 16 

Jim Kelly and Frank Reich managed just thirteen completions, but four of them were touchdowns as the Bills romped 35–7. Jeff George was benched after completing just 83 yards and Mark Herrmann was even worse, throwing three interceptions. The win secured the #1 playoff seed for the Bills.

Week 17

With the #1 AFC seed confirmed, the Bills started Frank Reich against the Lions, still fighting for a playoff bye with the Bears to play the 49ers on Monday Night. Barry Sanders rushed for 108 yards and a touchdown, and his burgeoning legend as impossible to bring down showed when Cornelius Bennett appeared to bring him down for a ten-yard loss in the first quarter but Sanders escaped for a one-yard gain. Reich's touchdown to Steve Tasker forced overtime but the Lions won on a 21-yard field goal, 17–14 the final; with San Francisco's 52–14 massacre of the Bears, the Lions secured a playoff bye.

Standings

Playoffs

Divisional

Conference Championship

Super Bowl 

The Bills became the eighth team to go scoreless in the first half, while the Redskins scored 17 points in the second quarter.

The Redskins then increased their lead 24–0 just 16 seconds into the second half after linebacker Kurt Gouveia intercepted Kelly's pass on the first play of the third quarter and returned it 23 yards to the Bills’ 2-yard line. One play later, Riggs scored his second touchdown of the game. The Redskins' 24–0 lead midway through the 3rd quarter was the largest shutout lead in Super Bowl history at the time; The San Francisco 49ers had led the Cincinnati Bengals 20–0 at halftime in Super Bowl XVI. The Seattle Seahawks led the Denver Broncos 36-0 right before the final play of the third quarter of Super Bowl XLVIII.

The Bills finally got some momentum going with their next few drives. First, they drove 77 yards to the Redskins 3 yard-line, aided by a 43-yard completion from Kelly to receiver Don Beebe. Washington kept Buffalo out of the end zone, but kicker Scott Norwood kicked a 21-yard field goal to cut their deficit to 24–3. Then aided by a 29-yard pass interference penalty on Redskins cornerback Martin Mayhew in the end zone, the Bills finally scored a touchdown on their next drive with a 1-yard run by Thomas to make the score 24–10.

The two teams combined for the most points in a 3rd quarter in a Super Bowl history (24 total points: 14 for Washington and 10 for Buffalo) and the most combined in a second half (44 total points: 24 for Buffalo and 20 for Washington).

But Buffalo's hopes of a comeback faded when Washington advanced 79 yards in 11 plays on their ensuing drive, scoring on Clark's 30-yard touchdown reception to give the Redskins a 31–10 lead with 1:24 left in the third period. Then 3 plays after receiving the ensuing kickoff, Kelly fumbled the ball while being sacked by defensive back Alvoid Mays, and it was recovered by defensive end Fred Stokes. After the turnover, Washington drove to the Bills 7-yard line and increased their lead to 34–10 with Lohmiller's 25-yard field goal on the second play of the fourth quarter.

Then on the Bills ensuing drive, Kelly was sacked for a 9-yard loss by Stokes, threw an incomplete pass, and then threw his second interception of the game to Edwards, who returned it 35 yards to Buffalo's 33-yard line. Five plays later, Lohmiller kicked his second field goal with 11:36 left in the game to increase Washington's lead to 37–10.  With the game almost completely out of reach, the Bills managed to respond with a 15-play, 79-yard drive to cut the score to 37–17 on a 2-yard touchdown pass from Kelly to Metzelaars. Then, after recovering an onside kick, the Bills drove 50 yards and scored another touchdown with Beebe's 4-yard reception to make the score 37–24. But the Bills’ second onside kick attempt was unsuccessful and the Redskins were able to run out the clock. From there, the Bills attempted one final pass play before time expired.

Kelly, completed 28 of a Super Bowl-record 58 passes for 275 yards and two touchdowns, but was sacked four times, intercepted four times, and lost one fumble. Thomas ran for only 13 yards on 10 carries and was limited to 27 yards on four receptions. James Lofton was the top receiver for the Bills with 7 catches for 92 yards. But Reed was limited to just 5 catches for 31 yards. Clark had seven catches for 114 yards and a touchdown and Monk added seven for 113 yards. (Clark and Monk became the third pair of teammates to each have 100 yards receiving in a Super Bowl; they joined the Steelers’ John Stallworth and Lynn Swann who did it in Super Bowl XIII and the Bengals’ Cris Collinsworth and Dan Ross who did it in Super Bowl XVI).

Awards and records
 Led NFL in Total Yards Rushing, 2381 yards
 Led AFC in Points Scored, 458
 Led AFC in Yards Gained, 6252
 Jim Kelly, NFL Leader, Touchdown Passes, 33
 Jim Kelly, AFC Leader, Passer Rating, 97.6
 Jim Kelly, Super Bowl record, Most Passes Attempted in a Super Bowl, 58
 Thurman Thomas, NFL MVP
 Thurman Thomas, UPI AFL-AFC Player of the Year
 Thurman Thomas, NEA NFL MVP 
 Thurman Thomas, PFWA NFL MVP 
 Thurman Thomas, NFL Offensive Player of the Year 
 Thurman Thomas, 1991 All-Pro Selection
 Thurman Thomas, NFL Combined Yards from Scrimmage Leader
 Thurman Thomas, AFC Leader, 1,407 Rushing Yards
 Thurman Thomas, AFC Leader, 12 Touchdowns

Notes

References

External links
 Bills on jt-sw.com
 Bills Stats on jt-sw.com

Buffalo Bills
AFC East championship seasons
American Football Conference championship seasons
Buffalo Bills seasons
Buff